"A Whole New Whirled" is the series premiere of the American superhero television series Peacemaker, a spin-off from the 2021 film The Suicide Squad. The episode was written and directed by the series creator James Gunn. It originally aired on HBO Max on January 13, 2022, alongside the two follow-up episodes.

The series is set after the events of The Suicide Squad, and follows Christopher Smith / Peacemaker. Smith returns to his home but is forced to work with A.R.G.U.S. agents on a classified operation only known as "Project Butterfly". Smith also has to deal with his personal demons, including feeling haunted by memories of people he killed for "peace", as well as reconnecting with his estranged father.

The series premiere received positive reviews from critics, who highlighted its humor, writing and performances, particularly John Cena.

Plot
Five months after the events in Corto Maltese, Christopher Smith / Peacemaker has recovered from the injuries he suffered there and is told he can leave the hospital. After confirming with a janitor that no one is looking for him, he leaves while wearing his suit. Unbeknownst to him, a nurse reports on his exit to a person known as "Mr. Murn".

Smith arrives at his house, forced to give his helmet to the taxi driver when he has no money. Inside, he finds many phone messages from a person known as Vigilante. Suddenly, A.R.G.U.S. agents Emilia Harcourt, John Economos, and Leota Adebayo hold him at gunpoint, revealing he was being followed after all. Their leader, Clemson Murn arrives and informs Smith that as he is still not done with his prison sentence. He is offering him to work for him in exchange for avoiding Belle Reve. Murn, working for Amanda Waller, is in charge of an operation known as Project Butterfly and wants Smith to cooperate in killing "Butterflies". Seeing he has no choice, Smith reluctantly agrees.

Smith goes to his father's house to retrieve his pet bald eagle, Eagly. His father, Auggie, reluctantly took care of the pet but is disapproving of his son's life, also displaying a racist attitude. After Auggie hands him a new helmet, Smith leaves. He arrives at a diner with the team, where Murn gives him a dossier with his target: he must kill a U.S. Senator. During their stay, an employee named Adrian Chase sees Smith and is silently ecstatic at seeing him. After talking with Adebayo, Smith follows  Harcourt to a bar and attempts to flirt with her. Harcourt is constantly harassed by some bar patrons, brutally attacks one of the men and coldly rejects Smith, also prompting her to leave the bar. Meanwhile, Abedayo has a call with her mother, Waller, to express her frustration with the team but Waller convinces her that she will eventually find something better.

After the rejection, Smith bonds with a woman named Annie Sturphausen at the bar and they have sex at her apartment. While Smith is distracted singing a song, Sturphausen grabs a kitchen knife and starts stabbing him. They engage in a brutal fight in the apartment and despite Smith's determination, he is no match to Sturphausen, who displays a superhuman roar and strength. Smith jumps from the window and runs back to his car in the parking lot. As Sturphausen runs to attack him, Smith activates a sonic boom weapon in his helmet, which destroys Sturphausen and a small part of the parking lot. As Eagly stays alongside Smith, police cruisers are seen in the distance.

Production

Development
In September 2020, HBO Max announced that it gave a series order to a series focusing on Christopher Smith / Peacemaker, portrayed by John Cena in The Suicide Squad. James Gunn, who wrote and directed The Suicide Squad, would serve as showrunner and direct many episodes, while Cena would also serve as co-executive producer. For Gunn, he viewed the series as "an opportunity to delve into current world issues through the lens of this superhero/supervillain/and world's biggest douchebag."

For influence, Gunn used Better Call Saul, Spartacus, the V series franchise, as well as the 1990 film Captain America. He particularly highlighted Better Call Saul in helping him develop the series, explaining, "Both Saul and Chris are kind of sad-sack characters who are really good at one thing and then really bad at a lot of other things. So I think it's really just taking that incredibly smart dialogue, that relaxed nature of grounded life and then mixing that with the other things that I wanted to do with the show."

In July 2021, the episode's title was revealed as "A Whole New Whirled".

Casting

The announcement of the series in September 2020 confirmed that John Cena would reprise his role as Christopher Smith / Peacemaker. Other actors that also reprise their roles from The Suicide Squad include Steve Agee as John Economos and Jennifer Holland as Emilia Harcourt.

Shortly after the series order, Danielle Brooks, Robert Patrick, Chris Conrad and Chukwudi Iwuji were announced as series regulars. In May 2021, it was announced that Conrad would leave the series due to creative differences, with his role being recast with Freddie Stroma.

In December 2020, Annie Chang and Lochlyn Munro joined the series to recur as Detectives Sophie Song and Larry Fitzgibbon. While they are credited in the opening sequence, they do not appear in the episode.

Viola Davis makes an uncredited cameo appearance as Amanda Waller, reprising her role from the DC Extended Universe. As the series is filmed in Vancouver, the crew visited Davis in Los Angeles to film her scene.

Visual effects
The episode introduces Eagly, Smith's pet bald eagle. The crew initially tried to film the scenes with a real eagle, but found it difficult with the eagle's behavior. They decided to use visual effects to create Eagly, which was accomplished by Weta Digital, which worked previously with Gunn in some of his films. Eagly's voice is provided by Dee Bradley Baker, who previously worked with Gunn in The Suicide Squad.

Critical reception
"A Whole New Whirled" received positive reviews from critics. Samantha Nelson of IGN gave the three-episode premiere a "great" 8 out of 10 rating and wrote in his verdict, "Peacemaker isn't quite as sharply written as Amazon's The Boys, but James Gunn is aiming for the same sort of subversive superhero show, using excessive violence and biting humor to deconstruct the failings of the genre. The three-episode premiere offers a goofy takedown of vigilantism while hinting at bigger and darker plots to come."

Jarrod Jones of The A.V. Club gave the three-episode premiere an "A-" grade and wrote, "Peacemaker is a stacked deck of fearsome insanity and there's a lot to accept in these first three episodes. It's vulgar, violent, prone to non sequitur, and has more than one dance sequence in store for you. But don't you dare let its ceaseless barrage of profanity, nudity, and slaughter dupe you into thinking otherwise: James Gunn's Peacemaker comes packing, among other things, a beating heart." Charles Bramesco of The Guardian gave the first three episodes a score of 3 out of 5, writing "James Gunn's Suicide Squad character gets his own HBO Max series with mixed results but a winning central performance."

Alan Sepinwall of Rolling Stone gave the three-episode premiere a 4 star rating out of 5 and wrote, "Between the blood and guts, the slapstick, the political satire, and the musical digressions, there is a lot going on here. Yet the series functions as a sincere character study of its flawed hero — and the unfortunate souls who have to work alongside him — just enough for the joke to never quite wear thin. Even in a wildly oversaturated market for tales of hypermuscular men and women punching their way to justice, Peacemaker stands out. You'll wanna taste it, even the parts that are in incredibly bad taste." Alec Bojalad of Den of Geek gave the three-episode premiere a 4 star rating out of 5 and wrote, "Ultimately, Peacemaker is another win for the suddenly surprisingly competitive DC Comics TV landscape."

Notes

References

External links
 

Peacemaker (TV series) episodes
2022 American television episodes
American television series premieres
Television episodes directed by James Gunn
Television episodes written by James Gunn